Holocentrinae is a subfamily of Holocentridae containing 40 recognized species and one proposed species. Its members are typically known as squirrelfish and all are nocturnal. All three genera in the subfamily are found in the Atlantic and Holocentrus is restricted to this ocean. Most species in genera Neoniphon and Sargocentron are from the Indo-Pacific region and several of these occur in the Indian Ocean west of the southern tip of India.

A rare example of the fish is featured in Ian Fleming's 1960 James Bond short story "The Hildebrand Rarity".

References

External links
 
 
 

Holocentridae
Fish subfamilies
Taxa named by John Richardson (naturalist)